Neville Price (Neville Graham Price; 1 June 1929 in East London – 28 December 1980) was a South African long jumper who competed in the 1952 Summer Olympics and in the 1956 Summer Olympics.

References

1929 births
1980 deaths
Sportspeople from East London, Eastern Cape
South African male triple jumpers
South African male long jumpers
Olympic athletes of South Africa
Athletes (track and field) at the 1952 Summer Olympics
Athletes (track and field) at the 1956 Summer Olympics
Athletes (track and field) at the 1950 British Empire Games
Commonwealth Games gold medallists for South Africa
Commonwealth Games medallists in athletics
20th-century South African people
21st-century South African people
Medallists at the 1950 British Empire Games